is a Japanese actress and voice actress from Tokyo, Japan.

Filmography

Television animation
Detective Conan (1997) – Etsuko (eps 88–89); Takako (ep 53)
In the Beginning: The Bible Stories (1997) – Eve
Fighting Spirit (2000) – Ippo's Mom
Saiyuki (2000) – Sister
The Twelve Kingdoms (2002) – Gyokuyou (older)
Samurai Champloo (2004) – Ogin
Mokke (2007) – Nakahara's mother (ep 20)
RIN ~Daughters of Mnemosyne~ (2008) – Yoshie Shimizu (ep 3)
Little Battlers Experience W (2013) - Claudia Lenetton
Sazae-san (2015) – Fune Isono (second voice)
Pandora in the Crimson Shell: Ghost Urn (2016) – Anna
Yu-Gi-Oh! VRAINS - Takeru's Grandmother

Live Action Roles
Kamen Rider BLACK (xxxx) (performed in Episode 3)

Dubbing

Live-action
28 Days (Lily Cummings (Elizabeth Perkins))
88 Minutes (Shelly Barnes (Amy Brenneman))
The Art of Racing in the Rain (Trish (Kathy Baker))
Basquiat (Big Pink (Courtney Love))
Blow (Ermine Jung (Rachel Griffiths))
Congo (Moira (Mary Ellen Trainor))
Conviction (Nancy Taylor (Melissa Leo))
Deadwater Fell (Carol Kendrick (Maureen Beattie))
Downfall (Magda Goebbels (Corinna Harfouch))
Erin Brockovich (Pamela Duncan (Cherry Jones))
Fifty Shades of Grey (Dr. Grace Trevelyan-Grey (Marcia Gay Harden))
Fifty Shades Freed (Grace Trevelyan Grey (Marcia Gay Harden))
The Jane Austen Book Club (Sylvia (Amy Brenneman))
Kissing Jessica Stein (Joan (Jackie Hoffman))
The Man in the Iron Mask (Queen Anne of Austria (Anne Parillaud))
The People vs. Larry Flynt (Ruth Carter Stapleton (Donna Hanover))
She-Wolf of London (Miss Rigby (Carol Kirkland))
Six Feet Under (Margaret Chenowith (Joanna Cassidy))
State of Play (Cameron (Helen Mirren))
Super 8 (Mrs. Kaznyk (Jessica Tuck))
The Wicker Man (Dr. T.H. Moss (Frances Conroy))

Animation
Invasion America (Cullen)

References

External links

1953 births
Living people
Japanese musical theatre actresses
Japanese video game actresses
Japanese voice actresses
Tamagawa University alumni
Voice actresses from Tokyo